The XV Army Corps / XV AK was a corps level command of the German Army before and during World War I.

XV Corps served on the Western Front from the start of the war with the 7th Army.  It was still in existence at the end of the war in the 19th Army, Heeresgruppe Herzog Albrecht von Württemberg on the Western Front.

Formation 
With the conclusion of the Franco-Prussian War and the annexation of Alsace-Lorraine, the XV Corps was formed in March 1871 with responsibility for the new Imperial provinces.  Headquarters was established in Strasbourg with the constituent units drawn from the armies of the various states of the German Empire.  The Corps initially covered the entire district of Alsace-Lorraine, but from April 1890 a new XVI Corps was formed in Lorraine and the Corps was restricted to Alsace.
 
It was assigned to the V Army Inspectorate which became the 7th Army at the start of the First World War.

Peacetime organisation 
The 25 peacetime corps of the German Army (Guards, I - XXI, I - III Bavarian) had a reasonably standardised organisation.  Each consisted of two divisions with usually two infantry brigades, one field artillery brigade and a cavalry brigade each.  Each brigade normally consisted of two regiments of the appropriate type, so each Corps normally commanded 8 infantry, 4 field artillery and 4 cavalry regiments.  There were exceptions to this rule:
V, VI, VII, IX and XIV Corps each had a 5th infantry brigade (so 10 infantry regiments)
II, XIII, XVIII and XXI Corps had a 9th infantry regiment
I, VI and XVI Corps had a 3rd cavalry brigade (so 6 cavalry regiments)
the Guards Corps had 11 infantry regiments (in 5 brigades) and 8 cavalry regiments (in 4 brigades).
Each Corps also directly controlled a number of other units.  This could include one or more 
Foot Artillery Regiment
Jäger Battalion
Pioneer Battalion
Train Battalion

World War I

Organisation on mobilisation 
On mobilization on 2 August 1914 the Corps was restructured.  30th Cavalry Brigade was withdrawn to form part of the 7th Cavalry Division and the 39th Cavalry Brigade was broken up and its regiments assigned to the divisions as reconnaissance units.  Divisions received engineer companies and other support units from the Corps headquarters. In summary, XV Corps mobilised with 26 infantry battalions, 10 machine gun companies (60 machine guns), 8 cavalry squadrons, 24 field artillery batteries (144 guns), 4 heavy artillery batteries (16 guns), 3 pioneer companies and an aviation detachment.

Combat chronicle 
At the outbreak of World War I, the Corps was assigned to the 7th Army on the left of the forces that executed the Schlieffen Plan.  It fought on the Western Front in Lorraine.  It was still in existence at the end of the war in the 19th Army, Heeresgruppe Herzog Albrecht von Württemberg on the Western Front.

Commanders 
The XV Corps had the following commanders during its existence:

See also 

German Army order of battle (1914)
German Army order of battle, Western Front (1918)
List of Imperial German infantry regiments
List of Imperial German artillery regiments
List of Imperial German cavalry regiments

References

Bibliography 
 
 
 
 
 

Corps of Germany in World War I
Military units and formations established in 1871
Military units and formations disestablished in 1919